Midland Junction Football Club, nicknamed the Railways, was an Australian rules football club that competed in the West Australian Football League (WAFL). The club played in the WAFL, the premier football league in Western Australia, from 1905 to 1910 and again from 1914 to 1917. They team wore black and gold hooped jumpers for the majority of the seasons they played in the WAFL. Charles "Wagga" Gast was Midland Junction's games record holder, playing 105 matches for the club. Based in the Perth suburb of Midland, the team drew the majority of their players from workers at the Midland Junction railway station and workshops. The club was one of the most unsuccessful in the WAFL's history, winning only 24.8% of the matches they contested.

History
Originally from the First Rate Junior Association, Midland Junction joined the WAFL in 1905. With the admission of Midland Junction (and East Perth in 1906), the WAFL expanded to an eight team competition. In their first season in the WAFL, Midland Junction finished in the bottom two and won only two matches for the entire season. After several poor seasons, Midland Junction were demoted from the WAFL at the conclusion of the 1910 season and they subsequently rejoined the First Rate Junior Association (renamed in 1907 to the West Australian Football Association). In their first season back in the WAFA, Midland Junction won the premiership, defeating Cottesloe in the Grand Final. After two more seasons in the WAFA, Midland Junction returned to the WAFL in 1914. Midland Junction's second stint in the WAFL began much more successfully than the first. In 1915, the club won more matches than it lost for the first time and in 1916 they scored a resounding 78-point victory over West Perth. That victory, however, was to be the high point of Midland Junction's history. Midway through the 1916 season, the club was "decimated" as many of the team's players signed up to fight in World War I. This started a decline for Midland Junction which resulted in them losing every match in the 1917 season. After such a disappointing season and with many of their players still fighting overseas, Midland Junction elected to disband at the season's end. The club never reformed.

See also
 Swan Districts Football Club, formed in 1932 and covering approximately the same territory

Notes

References

Footnotes

Bibliography

Australian rules football clubs in Western Australia
Sports clubs disestablished in 1917
Former West Australian Football League clubs
Midland, Western Australia
1917 disestablishments in Australia